Inspector Hornleigh is a fictional British detective from Scotland Yard, the protagonist of a popular BBC radio series of the 1930s, three British films, and a German television series.

The radio series Inspector Hornleigh Investigates was devised by Hans Priwin and Hornleigh was played by S. J. Warmington. The series ran on the BBC's National station from 1937 to 1940, as one element in the 50-minute show Monday Night at Seven. Each week Inspector Hornleigh interrogates various witnesses, one of whom makes some slip that incriminates him. Listeners were invited to match their wits against Hornleigh's by identifying the criminal. The mistake made by the witness is not disclosed until the end of the programme.

Between 1938 and 1940 a trilogy of films was made about Hornleigh, starring Gordon Harker in the title role: Inspector Hornleigh (1938), Inspector Hornleigh on Holiday (1939) and Inspector Hornleigh Goes To It (1940). All the films were made at Pinewood Studios in England. In the films Hornleigh is a cockney detective with the Metropolitan Police. He is accompanied by his inept Scottish sidekick Sergeant Bingham, played by Alastair Sim. The BBC radio series presented straight "whodunit" dramas, but the films were made as comedies. Despite their popularity, no further films were made because Sim wished to move on to other projects in order to avoid being typecast.

The television adaptation was made in West Germany in 1961, with Helmut Peine as Hornleigh.

References

External links
 

Fictional British police detectives
Films shot at Pinewood Studios